Frederic S. Fuchs  is a television and film producer active in the United States and Canada, where he holds dual citizenship. He became an executive in the Canadian Broadcasting Corporation on April 3, 2006.

Fuchs became known for the television series Faerie Tale Theatre. He afterwards became president of American Zoetrope, and thus had a hand in producing films such as The Godfather Part III (1990), The Rainmaker (1997) and The Virgin Suicides (1999). With CBC, his work  included the television series What It's Like Being Alone (2006). Later, he was an executive producer of the Starz and GK-TV series Camelot. Most recently, Fuchs has been the executive producer of the films Monkey Beach (2020) and The Virtuoso (2021). He also has founded a charitable organization that owns and operates an independent cinema, the Westdale Theatre, in Hamilton, Ontario. 

Fuchs gained further attention when he was the subject of a joke in the cult series Angry Video Game Nerd, originating in an episode where James Rolfe's character "The Nerd" sees Fuchs' name in the credits of Bram Stoker's Dracula and jokingly pronounces it "Fred Fucks". This later became a recurring joke throughout the series, with Gilbert Gottfried portraying a fictionalized version of him, as a deranged programmer who developed the PlayStation 4 game Life of Black Tiger (actually from Korean developer 1Games). A separate fictionalization of Fuchs additionally appears as the final boss in Angry Video Game Nerd Adventures and its enhanced port Angry Video Game Nerd I & II Deluxe; in the latter he was given a new design in Gottfried's likeness and new dialogue matching the personality of Gottfried's portrayal of the character.

Filmography
He was a producer in all films unless otherwise noted.

Film

Miscellaneous crew

As an actor

Thanks

Television

Miscellaneous crew

Thanks

Honors
Fuchs has been nominated for Emmy Awards in 1988, 1997 and 1998 for producing Tall Tales and Legends (1985) and television films on The Odyssey and Moby Dick.

References

External links

American film producers
American television producers
Canadian film producers
Canadian television producers
Living people
Year of birth missing (living people)